Jans is a Dutch patronymic surname equivalent to Johnson. Like, Janse, this form of the surname is a less common than the abundant Jansen, Janssen and Janssens. People with the name Jans include:
Alaric Jans (born 1949), American film and theater composer
Anneke Jans (1509–1539), Dutch anabaptist executed for heresy
Carlijn Jans (born 1987), Dutch volleyball player
Chris Jans (born 1969), American basketball coach
Edouard de Jans (1855–1919), Belgian portrait and genre painter
Edward Jans (born 1946), Canadian sports shooter
 (born 1954), Dutch theologian
Klaudia Jans-Ignacik (born 1984), Polish tennis player
Laurent Jans (born 1992), Luxembourgian footballer
Lies Jans (born 1974), Belgian politician
Lucretia Jans (1602 – after 1641), Dutch survivor of the Batavia shipwreck
Melanie Jans (born 1973), Canadian squash player
Mie Jans (born 1994), Danish footballer
Paul Jans (born 1981), Dutch footballer
 (1909–1994), Dutch Old Catholic bishop
Ron Jans (born 1958), Dutch football player and manager
Roy Jans (born 1990), Belgian road cyclist
Tom Jans (1948–1984), American folk musician
Wendy Jans (born 1983), Belgian snooker and pool player

Given name
Jans can also be a male or female given name:
Jans Aasman (born 1958), Dutch psychologist and Cognitive Science expert
Jans der Enikel (fl. 1271–1302), Viennese poet and historian
Jans Koerts (born 1969), Dutch male road bicycle racer
Jans Koster (born 1938), Dutch female freestyle swimmer
Jans Martense Schenck (1631–1687), Dutch settler in New Netherlands
Jans Rautenbach (1936–2016), South African screenwriter, film producer and director

Other
Neeltje Jans, local name for the goddess Nehalennia, after whom an artificial island in Zeeland has been named

See also
Geertgen tot Sint Jans (c.1460 – <1495), Dutch Renaissance painter

Dutch-language surnames
Patronymic surnames